W11 may refer to:
 Hansa-Brandenburg W.11, a 1917 fighter seaplane
 Mercedes-Benz W11, a road car produced by Mercedes-Benz between 1929 and 1934
 Mercedes-AMG F1 W11 EQ Performance, a Formula One car produced by Mercedes-Benz to compete in the 2020 Formula One World Championship
 W11, a postcode district in the W postcode area of London
W11 Opera, an opera company based in that district
 Winning Eleven, a soccer simulation game
 Worms: Open Warfare, the eleventh game in the Worms series
 Cierva W.11 Air Horse helicopter
 Wolf W-11 Boredom Fighter airplane
 Windows 11, a Microsoft operating system